is a Japanese manga anthology. It is marketed to seinen public (young adult men), edited and published monthly by Coamix. From 2010 to 2020, it was formerly published by North Stars Pictures and Tokuma Shoten. It was produced as a replacement for Weekly Comic Bunch, Coamix's previous manga anthology. The collected editions of their titles are published under the Zenon Comics imprint.

Overview
After the drop of Shinchosha's Weekly Comic Bunch circulation numbers, Coamix, which edited the magazine, announced Bunchs discontinuation. Coamix marked August 27, 2010 as the day of Bunchs last release, and started to consider to launch a new magazine. In October 2010, Coamix announced a partnership with North Stars Pictures and Tokuma Shoten, stating that the new magazine Monthly Comic Zenon would debut on October 25, 2010. At the same time Shinchosha launched Monthly Comics @ Bunch, a replacement for Weekly Comic Bunch, but edited without Coamix's involvement. As a result, many of the manga artists from Bunch have been moved to Zenon.

The magazine's name is based on —the Japanese name of bodhisattva Guanyin—, specifically the  part, which means to "hear the voice of the worldwide". The "Z" from "Zenon" was chosen with the meaning of "ultimate" since it is the last letter from alphabet.

In order to approach more readers, Monthly Comic Zenon is published in both, print and digital editions. The website "Zenon Land" was launched, publishing the Zenons manga series only for smartphones. A YouTube channel was created to disclose Zenon-related media. Also, "Cafe Zenon", a kissaten decorated with manga motifs, in Kichijōji, a neighborhood in the city of Musashino, Tokyo, was inaugurated on November 11, 2009.

To expand its range the magazine also promotes a "silent manga" contest; first, in 2011, it was a national competition. Starting from 2013, it became an international contest, in which no dialogues were necessary. Open for professional and amateurs, the focus of the judgment was the performance of the works through art rather than exposition. The judges were manga authors Tsukasa Hojo (City Hunter) and Tetsuo Hara (Fist of the North Star), then editor-in-chief Nobuhiko Horie and the magazine editorial team. The best five received prize awards while the top three had their works published in the magazine. The first international edition received 514 submissions from 53 countries, while in the second people from 65 countries submitted 609 works. Molico Ross, a winner of the domestic competition, wrote Nobo and Her? between 2012 and 2017, and Shinigami ni Datte, Ai wa Aru (published since 2017) is based on "Thirty and a Half Minutes", a work by the 4th international contest winner, Vietnamese female writer Snippy MJ.

In another action to expand its public, in August 2015, Coamix and The Silent Manga Audition Committee created a section called "Zenon International" on the contest website to publish the SMAC! Web Magazine. They announced plans to translate all the series and offer them for free on their site based on demand—which is based on the readers' vote. At first they made available Ikusa no Ko: Legend of Oda Nobunaga, Nobo and Her? and Arte, and in December Angel Heart became part of the catalog.

After a certain amount of chapters are serialized in the magazine they are collected into tankōbon format and published under the Zenon Comics imprint. Parallel to this label, there is Zenon Comics DX that only publishes titles former released by other publishers such as Tetsuo Hara's Cyber Blue (Weekly Shōnen Jump) and Kōkenryoku Ōryō Sōsakan Nakabō Rintarō (Bart 3230). This two titles composed Zenon Comics DX first line-up, while Zenon Comics one had Angel Heart: 2nd Season, Cat's Eye, Concierge Platinum, and Waraenu Warashi: 108 no Karma. Both imprints released its first titles on March 22, 2011. The Zenon Comics level also publishes manga released on Zenons sister magazine, . Published online since October 25, 2012, it is the home of series such as Hokuto no Ken: Ichigo Aji and Seikai Suru Kado: Aoi Haru to Railgun.

List of works
Ongoing series are highlighted in light green.

Notes

References

External links
Official website 

2010 establishments in Japan
Monthly manga magazines published in Japan
Magazines established in 2010
Seinen manga magazines
Tokuma Shoten magazines
Magazines published in Tokyo